The Melbourne Stars are an Australian Twenty20 franchise cricket team, based in Melbourne, Victoria that competes in Australia's Twenty20 competition, the Big Bash League. The Stars wear a green uniform and play their home matches at the Melbourne Cricket Ground. Glenn Maxwell, recently achieved the highest individual score in Big Bash League history, scoring 154* against the Hobart Hurricanes at the MCG.

Season results

Honours

Domestic
Big Bash:
Champions (0):
Runners Up (3): 2015–16, 2018–19, 2019–20
Minor Premiers (2): 2013–14, 2019–20
Finals Series Appearances (8): 2011–12, 2012–13, 2013–14, 2014–15, 2015–16, 2016–17, 2018–19, 2019–20
Wooden Spoons (2): 2017–18, 2022–23

Mascots
Starman & Starlet are two of the official mascots of the Melbourne Stars. In BBL|05 the Stars introduced a secondary mascot, Steven Seagull, the year after a seagull was struck with a cricket ball hit by Perth Scorchers batsman Adam Voges during a match between Melbourne Stars and Perth Scorchers in BBL|04 while the Stars were fielding at the Melbourne Cricket Ground. Rob Quiney, who was the first to the scene, immediately signalled that he feared the worst for the stricken bird as it lay motionless on the ground, before he delicately carried it over the boundary rope and placed it back on the turf. But just minutes later, the bird came back to life and started the walk along the boundary line, much to the delight of the huge MCG crowd.

Squad
The current squad of the Melbourne Stars for the 2022–23 Big Bash League season as of 28 January 2023.

 Players with international caps are listed in bold.
  denotes a player who is currently unavailable for selection.
  denotes a player who is unavailable for rest of the season.

List of captains 

Current captain listed in bold.

Rivalries
 The Melbourne Derby – When the league began in 2011, Cricket Australia decided they would place two teams in Melbourne. With the core group of players for both sides coming from the Victoria cricket team, this rivalry automatically became widely anticipated in Melbourne. The derby between the new two teams Melbourne Stars and Melbourne Renegades quickly became hugely popular with big crowds flocking in to the derby matches at both of the MCG and Marvel Stadium in Melbourne. In the fifth season, during the first of the two BBL|05 derbies at the MCG, it drew a record crowd of 80,883 which is the highest crowd for any domestic cricket match ever in the history of the sport.
 Other Rivalries – Other rivalries include the Scorchers v Stars (following close finals encounters) and the Stars v the Sydney Sixers and the Sydney Thunder, due to the rivalry between Melbourne and Sydney.

  Denotes BBL play-off matches.
  Denotes BBL grand final matches.

Sponsors

International players

 Withdrew without playing a game
 Did not play due to injury

See also

Melbourne Renegades
Cricket Victoria
Victorian Cricket Team
BBL

References

External links
 

Big Bash League teams
Cricket clubs in Melbourne
Cricket clubs in Victoria (Australia)
2011 establishments in Australia
Cricket clubs established in 2011
Cricket in Melbourne